, also known as 2008 XB, is an eccentric sub-kilometer asteroid, categorized as a near-Earth object and potentially hazardous asteroid of the Apollo group with a diameter of approximately . It was first observed on 1 December 2008, by the Mount Lemmon Survey at Mount Lemmon Observatory in Arizona, United States.

Orbit 

 orbits the Sun at a distance of 0.6–3.6 AU once every 3 years (1,088 days). Its orbit has an eccentricity of 0.73 and an inclination of 7° with respect to the ecliptic.

Close approaches 

On 21 October 2014, it passed  from Earth. On 10 April 2047, the asteroid will safely pass  from Earth.

Although some inaccurate press reports have suggested that it may pose an impact risk to Earth, the NASA/JPL Near Earth Object Program Office reported that it poses no risk of impact to any planet for at least 150 years. Between 1904 and 2174, the closest approach it makes to any planet was on 9 June 2008 when it passed  from Mars. The asteroid has never been listed on the Sentry Risk Table and has a well determined orbit with an observation arc of 6 years.

Discovery 

The asteroid was first detected on 1 December 2008 by the Mount Lemmon Survey and received the provisional designation . However, at an apparent magnitude of 20 and an assumed orbital eccentricity of 0.3, the object had a very short observation arc of less than 2 hours and the body became a lost minor planet.

See also 
 , one of the most dangerous asteroids discovered in 2014 that is on the Sentry Risk Table

References

External links 
 
 
 

Minor planet object articles (unnumbered)

20141021
20141027